Giovanni Di Clemente (5 February 1948 in – 2 January 2018) was an Italian television and film producer.

Born in Rome, Di Clemente won two David di Donatello Awards, in 1986 the award for best producer thanks to Mario Monicelli's Let's Hope It's a Girl a special David and in 1996 for his overall production work. He died on 2 January 2018 in Rome, aged 69.

Selected filmography 

 1974  - Drama of the Rich  
 1977  - Highway Racer  
   1980   - Delitto a Porta Romana
   1980   - Il ficcanaso
   1980   - Speed Cross  
   1981   - Odd Squad 
   1983   - Conquest
   1983   - Segni particolari: bellissimo 
   1985   - Mamma Ebe
  1986  - Let's Hope It's a Girl
   1987   - Devils of Monza  
   1988   - The Rogues 
   1989   - 'O Re
   1989   - Scugnizzi 
  1990  - Dark Illness 
   1992   - Close Friends
   1992   - Parenti serpenti 
  1993  - Giovanni Falcone  
  1995  - Looking for Paradise 
  1997 - The Game Bag 
   1998   - Of Lost Love
  1999 - A Respectable Man 
   1999   - Dirty Linen
   1999   - Illuminata

References

External links 
 

1948 births
2018 deaths
Mass media people from Rome
Italian film producers
David di Donatello winners
Italian television producers